The Cambridge Union Society, also known as the Cambridge Union, is a debating and free speech society in Cambridge, England, and the largest society in the University of Cambridge. Founded in 1815, it is the oldest continuously running debating society in the world. Additionally, the Cambridge Union has served as a model for the foundation of similar societies at several other prominent universities, including the Oxford Union and the Yale Political Union. The Union is a private society with membership open to all students of Cambridge University and Anglia Ruskin University. The Cambridge Union is a registered charity and is completely separate from the Cambridge University Students' Union.

The Cambridge Union has a long and extensive tradition of hosting prominent figures from all areas of public life in its chamber, both state- and international-based, including the Dalai Lama, President Ronald Reagan, Bill Gates, Stephen Hawking, Prime Ministers Winston Churchill, Margaret Thatcher and John Major, presidential candidate Bernie Sanders, as well as comedian Stephen Fry. Previous presidents of the Cambridge Union have included author Arianna Huffington and economist John Maynard Keynes.

History

The Cambridge Union was founded on 13 February 1815, eight years before the Oxford Union was founded in 1823. Several years after it was founded, on 24 March 1817, the Cambridge Union was temporarily shut down by the University. In 1821 the Union was allowed to reform, under strict guidelines.

The Cambridge Union's Bridge Street premises were designed by Alfred Waterhouse (who went on to design the Oxford Union Society's building) and formally opened on 30 October 1866. An additional wing was added several decades later. The future radical Liberal politician, Sir Charles Dilke, was the President chiefly responsible for construction. Included among the building's many rooms are the debating chamber, a dining room, bar, snooker room, the Keynes Library and various offices.

Although Cambridge escaped virtually undamaged from the widespread bombing destruction of World War II, the Union's building was hit by a bomb dropped during one attack. The explosion caused extensive damage to the Union's library.

Modern developments 
The Union is legally a self-funded charity that owns and has full control over its private property and buildings in the Cambridge city centre. It enjoys strong relations with the university, and allows other student societies to hire rooms for a nominal cost. Guests are sometimes admitted to Union events for a charge.

After more than 200 years, the Cambridge Union is best known for its debates, which receive national and international media attention. The top members of its debating team compete internationally against other top debating societies. The program also includes special events, such as a comedy debate in collaboration with the Cambridge Footlights. The Union also organises talks by visiting speakers and a wide array of events throughout the academic year.

The Cambridge Union is sometimes confused with the Cambridge University Students' Union, the student representative body set up in 1971; consequently, the term 'President of the Union' may cause confusion. Although the Cambridge Union has never functioned as a students' union in the modern sense, it did briefly affiliate to the UK's National Union of Students in 1924.

In 2015 the Union celebrated its bicentenary; a committee composed of former and current Officers was put together to organise a range of events to mark the occasion. This included special debates, dinners and parties in Cambridge and, for the first time in its history, in London.

2016 redevelopment project 
In January 2015 the Union announced a £9.5m refurbishment project to begin in late 2016 to address major structural problems and to expand existing facilities, subject to approval by planners, to include a new Wine Bar on the ground floor and a Jazz & Comedy Club in the basement (in the old home of the Cambridge Footlights). It also announced a plan to use the revenue generated from the new building to reduce membership fees to make the Union more accessible to students from lower income backgrounds, and to increase the size of its competitive debating activities for disadvantaged children and students.

The development was to be partially financed through the leasing of disused parts of its site to Trinity College in a deal worth £4.5 million. Planning permission was received in 2016, and a fundraising campaign to cover the remaining cost was to be launched on 11 March 2017 with a special debate between Jon Snow and Nick Robinson. Construction on the major redevelopment project was scheduled to begin in Michaelmas 2018.

Gallery

Membership

The Cambridge Union receives no formal funding from the University and raises funds for event expenses and building maintenance through membership fees and sponsorship.  
For most of its history the Cambridge Union was an all-male club. By the early 1960s this was perceived as an embarrassment and an anachronism. Votes were held to amend the constitution to allow women as members, but although a majority voted in favour, they failed to meet the two-thirds majority required by the constitution to make constitutional change. On one occasion a female student gate-crashed a debate  and was removed, the whole incident seen and reported in the national press. In about 1965  the amendment was passed and in Michaelmas 1967 Ann Mallalieu became the first female president.

Membership is now open to all students at the University of Cambridge and Anglia Ruskin University.  Members are able to bring guests to certain functions provided that the guests would not be allowed to purchase membership.  Social events and events organised by external bodies are occasionally open to the public, with discounts for Union members.

The Union launched online membership in late 2015, which allowed any student around the world access to live streams of events for an annual subscription.

Honorary members 
The union awards honorary memberships to particularly distinguished individuals. Honorary members include:

 Raif Badawi
 Ensaf Haidar
 Prince Philip, Duke of Edinburgh
 Anne, Princess Royal
 John Major
 Alfred Waterhouse
 Desmond Tutu
 Stephen Hawking
 Harold Macmillan
 F. W. de Klerk
 Lech Wałęsa
 Jesse Jackson
 Ronald Reagan
 Bernie Sanders

Speakers and debates 
The Union puts on a wide variety of events for its members, but is best known for its Thursday night debates and individual speaker events. In both of these, leading figures from public life are invited to discuss something of interest to the membership. One of the Union's most famous debates in recent years was between Richard Dawkins and Rowan Williams in February 2013, on the motion, 'This House Believes Religion has no place in the 21st Century', which was rejected by the assembled members. The Union's debates regarding religion have also created several controversial incidents, including in October 2014, when Peter Hitchens, speaking in favour of the motion 'This House Regrets the Rise of New Atheism', appeared to break the rules of the House by physically intimidating Lord Desai after a heated exchange.

Speakers hosted by the Union have included:

 British prime ministers Winston Churchill, Clement Attlee, Margaret Thatcher, John Major, Theresa May and Boris Johnson
 US Presidents Theodore Roosevelt and Ronald Reagan
 The First Prime Minister of India Jawaharlal Nehru
 Haile Selassie, Emperor of Ethiopia 
 The First democratically elected President of Iraq Jalal Talabani, 
 The Last President of apartheid-era South Africa, F. W. de Klerk
 German Chancellor Helmut Kohl
 Australian Prime Minister John Howard
 Libyan dictator Muammar al-Gaddafi
 The Spiritual leader of Tibet, The Dalai Lama
 Prominent Conservative politicians Michael Portillo, Jacob Rees-Mogg and Andrea Leadsom
 Former Leader of the Labour Party Jeremy Corbyn
 Former Leader of UKIP Nigel Farage
 American Presidential candidate and Vermont Senator Bernie Sanders
 Speaker of the US House of Representatives Nancy Pelosi
 French Presidential candidate Marine Le Pen
 Microsoft co-founder and philanthropist Bill Gates
 Theoretical physicist Stephen Hawking
 African-American writer and activist James Baldwin
 Academic Germaine Greer
 Artificial Intelligence Engineer Tshilidzi Marwala
 Economists Ha Joon Chang and Jeffrey Sachs
 Wikileaks founder Julian Assange
 Actors Brian Blessed, Bradley Whitford, Judi Dench, Clint Eastwood, Roger Moore, Bill Nighy and Robert De Niro
 Former head of the IMF Dominique Strauss-Kahn 
 Chat show host Jerry Springer 
 Actress and model Pamela Anderson
 Magician David Blaine 
 Comedian and political activist Russell Brand
 American civil rights activists Jesse Jackson and Al Sharpton
 Second person to walk on the moon Buzz Aldrin.
 Actress and activist Rose McGowan
 Professor and author Jordan Peterson
 American EPA Administrator Andrew Wheeler

Governance 
The Cambridge Union is an organisation that was founded and is headed by students. Each term is planned and carried out by a mixture of elected officers and appointed student staff, with support from the organisation's non-student staff and trustees. The governance of the Cambridge Union is mandated by its Constitution.

The Standing Committee 

The Standing Committee (or 'Voting Members') is the Union's primary managerial body of 14 members, which consists of the current President, Vice-President and Officers, the President-Elect and Officers-Elect, and the Debating Officers and Treasurer. All Officers of the Union are elected by its membership on a termly basis, with the exception of the Vice-President, Treasurer and two Debating Officers, who are appointed on an annual basis.

Officers of the Union are elected a term in advance, allowing them to serve one term as an officer-elect to prepare for their following term in office. Termly elected officers serve a term (and its preceding vacation) as "officer-elect", during which time they are members of Standing Committee.

Full Committee 
During every term, the Standing Committee appoints a variety of positions within the Union. These range from the Secretary to positions in the Events Management, Publicity, Audio-Visual and Press departments, among others. Collectively, these positions are referred to as 'Full Committee'.

The Trustees 

The Board of Trustees, currently chaired by Lord Chris Smith, is responsible for overseeing the long-term development of the Union's finances and property.  Whilst the Trustees are not intimately involved with the day-to-day running of the Union, they maintain ultimate legal responsibility for the organization, its assets and status as a registered charity. To maintain the link between the Student management and the Trustees, the President, the Vice President, and a Debating Officer of the Union are traditionally appointed as Trustees for the duration of their term in office.

Review Committee 
The Review Committee of the Cambridge Union is a committee of former Officers appointed by Standing Committee under the guidance of the Vice President. It is responsible for handling all disciplinary matters of the Union and may also be called upon to adjudicate on electoral malpractice. No member of Review Committee may serve as an elected officer for the duration of their term.

Staff 
In addition to these posts the Union also maintains an employed staff consisting of a Bursar, responsible for overseeing the long-term health of the charity, Office Managers and a Bar Manager. The Union also holds contracts for catering, cleaning, building maintenance, property management, IT services and legal advice.

Members of staff are employed by the Union's subsidiary events company. The President, Vice-President, Bursar and other Trustees appointed on an ad-hoc basis serve as Directors of the company.

Past officers 

Many of the Union's former Officers have gone on to considerable personal success after their time involved in the society. Notable past Presidents and officers include:

 Jack Ashley
 Clare Balding
 Gavin Barwell
 Peter Bazalgette
 Karan Bilimoria
 Leon Brittan
 Rab Butler
 Vince Cable
 Kenneth Clarke
 Edward John Gambier
 Robert Harris
 Helene Hayman
 Michael Howard
 Arianna Huffington
 Douglas Hurd
 John Maynard Keynes
 Norman Lamont
 Charles Lysaght
 Andrew Mitchell
 Philip Noel-Baker
 G. Godfrey Phillips
 James Peiris
 Michael Ramsey
 Christopher Steele
 Gerald Strickland
 Adair Turner
 Spencer Horatio Walpole

In addition to the long list of real life distinguished individuals that served as officers of the Cambridge Union during their time in Cambridge, Will Bailey, a fictional character on The West Wing, a US television drama series, claimed to have been a "former president of the Cambridge Union on a Marshall Scholarship", as well as MacKenzie McHale, a fictional character in the hit US series, The Newsroom.

Constitution 
The Cambridge Union was famous within the University for having a very long and complicated constitution; it is a common rumour that the constitution is longer than the entire Constitution of Canada. This was in fact untrue, but only just: a quick count puts the old Union constitution in question at 31,309 words while the complete Constitution of Canada is 31,575 words long. If the University's rules on Single Transferable Voting are included, then this Constitution was indeed longer than that of Canada. These rules are referenced within this old constitution, but are not contained.

Recordings and streaming

YouTube 
On 9 May 2011, the Union launched its online public video service CUS-Connect, whereby recordings of past events and interviews were uploaded for free viewing. These have since been transferred the Union's YouTube channel titled 'The Cambridge Union'. Before 2014, the Union only occasionally live-streamed popular events, with the first ever live stream held on 12 May 2011, in which Stephen Fry debated Radio 1 DJ Kissy Sell Out on the motion: "This House believes that classical music is irrelevant to today's youth".

Members' streaming service 
As part of its bicentennial celebrations in 2015, the Union launched a permanent live streaming service, to be integrated with a new automatic multi-camera rig in the Main Chamber. The new service includes the ability for "virtual" attendees to contribute to debates via questions and comments to be read out on the floor of the Union. The streaming service is hosted on the Union's website and is available only to members.

Controversy

Hosting of speakers 
The Cambridge Union, like its Oxford counterpart, has faced controversy over its choice of speakers. Protests have been arranged by students against the appearance of Universities Minister David Willetts, Government Minister Eric Pickles, during which the building was broken into, former IMF chief Dominique Strauss-Kahn, French politician Marine Le Pen and Wikileaks Founder Julian Assange. In January 2015, the hosting of Germaine Greer caused a public row between the Union and the Cambridge Students' Union's LGBT+ group, due to Greer's alleged transmisogyny towards Rachael Padman.
 In June 2019, the hosting of Malaysian Prime Minister Mahathir Mohamad attracted criticism from the Union of Jewish Students, the Board of Deputies of British Jews, and several former Cambridge Union members including former President Adam Cannon due to the former's anti-Semitic remarks. In February 2022, the Union hosted the Israel ambassador Tzipi Hotovely in a high-security, balloted event, resulting in protests and minor vandalism of the premises.

Responding to these criticisms, the Union is often quoted as upholding the universal right to free speech, against the principles of No Platform passed by the National Union of Students and upheld by a few groups within Cambridge.

2015 Counter-Terrorism Bill 
Lobbying by former Union Presidents Lord Deben and Lord Lamont resulted in the specific exclusion of the Cambridge and Oxford Unions from the Government's counter-terrorism bill, amid fears it could restrict free debate. Deben argued that the provisions within the bill would have prevented the hosting of British Union of Fascists' leader Oswald Mosley in the 1950s, concluding that the bill threatened "an essential British value". The National Union of Students used the exclusion to argue that the passage of the Bill was too rapid and ill-thought out, whilst both the Oxford and Cambridge Union reaffirmed that they were not legally part of their respective Universities and thus were never subject to the bill in the first place.

Strong opposition to the bill from Liberal Democrats and senior Conservative peers eventually resulted in the shelving of provisions regarding Universities' until after the 2015 General Election. The Counter Terrorism and Security Act 2015 eventually clarified that Higher Education institutions must retain particular regard to the duty to ensure freedom of speech and the importance of academic freedom within University societies, although it is unclear whether this applies to the Union.

Referendum on Julian Assange 
The union called a referendum on the hosting of Julian Assange on 22 October 2015, arguing that his residency in the Ecuadorian Embassy meant he was outside the jurisdiction of UK law, and thus required the consultation of its members considering a lack of past precedent. The referendum was more widely viewed as an opinion poll on the union's refusal to "no platform" speakers. It passed with 76.9% of the vote. Turnout was 1463.

See also 
 List of presidents of The Cambridge Union
 Oxford Union
 Stubbs Society
 Durham Union
 Berkeley Forum
 Grimshaw Club (LSE)
 Olivaint Conference of Belgium

References

Notes

Further reading

External links 

 
 The Cambridge Union Society – Constitution
 This House – The Cambridge Union Society at 200, article at the Cambridge University alumni website

 
1815 establishments in England
Alfred Waterhouse buildings
Buildings and structures in Cambridge